Colletteichthys dussumieri is a species of toadfish of the family Batrachoididae.

Etymology
The specific name honours the French explorer and trader Jean-Jacques Dussumier (1792-1883) who collected the type specimen.

References

Batrachoididae
Taxa named by Achille Valenciennes
Fish described in 1837